The Kiss of Death (El petó de la mort in Catalan and El beso de la muerte in Spanish) is a marble sculpture in Poblenou Cemetery in Barcelona. The sculpture is thought to have been created by Jaume Barba in 1930 because his signature lies on the sculpture's side, although others have claimed that it was more likely designed by Barba's son-in-law, Joan Fontbernat. The sculpture, an example of memento mori art, depicts death, in the form of a winged skeleton, planting a kiss on the forehead of a young man.

Background
The sculpture is found above the grave of the textile manufacturer Josep Llaudet Soler. The tomb underneath is inscribed with the following verse from Jacint Verdauger, a prominent Catalan poet: 

Original in Catalan:"Mes son cor jovenívol no pot més.

En ses venes la sanch s’atura y glaça.

Y l’esma ja perduda, la fe abraça,

sentint-se caure de la mort al bes."English Translation:"But his youthful heart can do no more.

In his veins the blood stops and freezes.

Spirit now lost faith embraces him,

And he falls feeling the kiss of death" 
The sculpture is often said to have inspired The Seventh Seal, by Ingmar Bergman.

Imagery

Rather than depicting death as an angel, the sculptor instead chose a winged skeleton. The image of death can thus be seen as both haunting and beautiful. The sculpture shows the youth's reaction to death, but it is unclear whether his expression is that of ecstasy or horror.

References

1930 sculptures
Marble sculptures in Spain
1930 establishments in Spain
Outdoor sculptures in Catalonia
Sculptures of men in Spain